The 2013–14 Memphis Tigers men's basketball team represented the University of Memphis in the 2013–14 NCAA Division I men's basketball season, the 93rd season of Tiger basketball. The Tigers played their home games at the FedExForum in Memphis. The 2013–14 season was the first season the Tigers participated in the American Athletic Conference. They finished the season 24–10, 12–6 in AAC play to finish in a three-way tie for third place. They lost in the quarterfinals of the AAC tournament to UConn. They received an at-large bid to the NCAA tournament where they defeated George Washington in the second round before losing in the third round to Virginia.

Previous season
The 2012–13 Memphis Tigers finished the season with a record of 31–5 (16–0 C-USA) and ranked 19th in the AP poll. The Tigers won the regular season C-USA title as well as the 2013 Conference USA men's basketball tournament to secure a berth in the 2013 NCAA Division I men's basketball tournament as a 6 seed in the Midwest.  The Tigers defeated 11 seed St. Mary's, the first tournament win for Josh Pastner, before falling to 3 seed Michigan State in their second game.

Off-season

Departures
 #2 Antonio Barton, junior guard, graduate transfer to Tennessee
 #10 Tarik Black, junior forward/center, graduate transfer to Kansas
 #0 Ferrakohn Hall, senior forward
 #23 Charles Holt, senior guard
 #32 Stan Simpson, senior center
 #30 D. J. Stephens, senior forward
 #4 Adonis Thomas, sophomore forward, declared for NBA draft

Transfers

Recruiting
The Tigers' 2013 recruiting class was ranked as the third best class in the country by ESPN and Rivals.

Season summary 
The Tigers entered the 2013–14 season ranked 13th in both the AP and Coaches polls. On October 30, Memphis announced that freshman Kuran Iverson would be suspended by the NCAA for the team's first regular-season game against Austin Peay due to his participation in an unauthorized summer league game near his home in Connecticut.  On November 7, senior forward David Pellom underwent knee surgery which was expected to prevent him from playing for five weeks. However, Pellom was able to return to limited game action by November 28.

In their first game against a ranked opponent, the Tigers were defeated by then #7 Oklahoma State in dominating fashion.  Marcus Smart scored 39 points en route to a 21-point victory over the Tigers.

The Tigers participated in the Old Spice Classic, an early season tournament in Orlando.  The field for the Old Spice also included LSU, Purdue, Butler, Washington State, St. Joseph's, Siena, and Oklahoma State.  The Tigers defeated Siena in the first round and LSU in the semifinal.  They again faced Oklahoma State, then the fifth ranked team in the country, in the final on December 1.  The Tigers defeated the Cowboys by 5, marking Josh Pasner's first win over an AP top 25 team.  Shaq Goodwin was named MVP of the tournament, and Austin Nichols was named to the all-tournament team.

The Tigers' next big out of conference game occurred on December 17 in the Jimmy V Classic against #16 Florida.  The Tigers and Gators played a back and forth game with the Gators coming out on top by 2.  Both teams were praised by sportswriters for the level of play in the game.

The inaugural AAC conference season began on New Year's Eve, where the Tigers faced South Florida on the road.  The Tigers picked up their first victory in their new conference with a strong performance, overwhelming the Bulls.  In the Tigers' second AAC game, they faced the 12–2 Cincinnati Bearcats at the Forum in a renewal of an old rivalry between the new conference mates.  The first half was closely contested, with the Tigers leading all but the final seconds of the half.  However, Cincinnati pulled away in the second half while Memphis shot poorly from the outside, ending the game 2 for 17 from three-point range.

The Tigers next went on the road to 12th ranked Louisville.  The Tigers defeated the defending NCAA champions 73–67. After the game, Coach Pastner and the team were heckled by Louisville fans who called the Tigers "thugs" and "classless."  Pastner responded by yelling to the fans that his team has a perfect Academic Progress Rate score.

The Tigers final out of conference regular-season game took place on February 8 at the Forum against #23 Gonzaga.  The Tigers went down by as many as 12 points in the second half. However, after a comeback sparked by a block by 6 foot Joe Jackson against 7 foot 1 inch Gonzaga center Przemek Karnowski, the Tigers defeated Gonzaga by 6.

The Tigers suffered their only loss to a team with a losing record at the hands of the Houston Cougars on February 27.  However, two days later, the Tigers took out #7 Louisville at home to sweep the season series with the Cardinals.

The #19 Tigers entered the AAC tournament with a 12–6 record in conference and in a three-way tie for third with SMU and UConn.  Due to tiebreak rules, however, the Tigers ended up as the 5th seed in the AAC tournament and took on 4 seed UConn.  The 21st ranked Huskies dominated the Tigers in the AAC quarterfinals at the FedExForum, winning all three games against the Tigers on the year. The Tigers fell out of both polls for the first time of the 13–14 season thereafter.

The Tigers earned an at large bid to the 2014 NCAA tournament, where they were placed in the East region as an 8 seed.  The Tigers defeated 9 seed George Washington on March 21 in Raleigh, North Carolina.  They fell to 1 seed Virginia in next round, 60 to 78.

The Tigers finished the year with a 5–6 record against top 25 teams.  The 11 games against ranked opponents and 5 top 25 wins both were the most recorded by the Tigers in a season since Josh Pastner became coach in 2009.  However, the 7 of the Tigers' 10 losses on the season were by double digits, also the most in a single season under Pastner.

Roster

Schedule

|-
!colspan=9 style="background:#0C1C8C; color:#8E9295;"| Exhibition

|-
!colspan=9 style="background:#0C1C8C; color:#8E9295;"| Regular season

|-
!colspan=9 style="background:#0C1C8C; color:#8E9295;"| American Athletic Conference tournament

|-
!colspan=9 style="background:#0C1C8C; color:#8E9295;"| NCAA Tournament

Rankings

References

Memphis
Memphis Tigers men's basketball seasons
Memphis
Memphis
Memphis